Gymnaspidina is a subtribe of armored scale insects. Takagi (2002) does not mention the Gymnaspidina, but in 2006 Morse and Normark still placed Gymnaspis aechmeae within the Parlatoriini tribe. Anderson (2010) found Gymnaspidina to be radically polyphyletic and suggested that the gymnaspids and the furcaspids might be placed in a distinct, but laterally equivalent subfamily to the Diaspidinae, rather than in the Aspidiotinae.

Genera
Bigymnaspis
Cryptoparlatorea
Cryptoparlatoreopsis
Doriopus
Emmereziaspis
Eugreeeniella
Formosapis
Gymnaspis
Ischnafiorinia
Labidaspis
Lindingeria
Mixaspis
Neoparlatoria
Porogymnaspis
Sakaramyaspis
Silvestraspis

References

Parlatoriini